John Thome may refer to:
 John M. Thome, American-Argentine astronomer
 John Thome (American football), American football and baseball coach